The 2015–16 Nicholls State Colonels women's basketball team represented Nicholls State University during the 2015–16 NCAA Division I women's basketball season. The Colonels, led by eighth year head coach DoBee Plaisance, played their home games at Stopher Gym and were members of the Southland Conference. They finished the season 10–19, 8–10 in Southland play to in seventh place. They lost in the first round of the Southland women's tournament to Sam Houston State.

Roster

Schedule

|-
!colspan=9 style=";"| Non-conference regular season

|-
!colspan=9 style=";"|  Southland Conference regular season

|-
!colspan=9 style=";"|  Southland Conference tournament

Source

See also
2015–16 Nicholls State Colonels men's basketball team

References

Nicholls Colonels women's basketball seasons
Nicholls State
Nicholls
Nicholls